Nasa Q'ara (Aymara nasa nose, q'ara bare, bald, also spelled Nasacara, Nasaq'ara) is a  mountain in the Cordillera Real in the Andes of Bolivia. It is located in the La Paz Department, Los Andes Province, Pucarani Municipality. Nasa Q'ara is situated south-west of the mountain Chiqapa and north-east of the mountain Ch'iyar K'ark'a. It lies north of the lake Allqa Quta and south of a small lake named Khunu Quta ("snow lake").

See also
 Kunturiri
 Q'ara Quta

References 

Mountains of La Paz Department (Bolivia)